Oulad Teima also known as Houara (Berber: ⵡⵍⴰⴷ ⵜⴻⵢⵎⴰ or ⵀⵓⵡⴰⵔⴰ) is a city in Taroudant Province, Souss-Massa, Morocco. According to the 2014 Moroccan census it had a population of 89,387, up from 66,183 in the 2004 census.

Vegetation 

Ouled Teima is surrounded by agricultural areas marked by farms and fields with different crops. A belt formed by a forest area with a predominance of argans can also be noted.

References

Populated places in Taroudannt Province
Municipalities of Morocco